Pranjal Yadav is an Indian Administrative Services officer who is the Special Secretary at the National Integration Department; Special Secretary, Medical Health & Family Welfare and Additional Mission Director, National Health Mission, Government of Uttar Pradesh.

Education
He completed his B.Tech in mechanical engineering from IIT-Roorkee before getting into IAS in 2006.

Career
In June 2007, he started his career as an assistant collector in Allahabad district and then went next to Siddharth Nagar sub-division as a joint collector. He was the Azamgarh DM before he was transferred to Varanasi. Yadav was appointed on 3 February 2013 in Kashi. He has worked against illegal occupation on the streets and for the protection of the Ganga river's historical Ghats.

Controversies
Pranjal faced controversies over not allowing the prime ministerial candidate to hold a public rally. The Bharatiya Janata Party (BJP) Prime Ministerial candidate in Varanasi, Narendra Modi, has been a favorite of the locals despite not allowing the rally to be held in the sensitive Benia Bagh ground in 2014.

References

Living people
Indian Administrative Service officers
Indian government officials
People from Kanpur Nagar district
IIT Roorkee alumni
Year of birth missing (living people)